André Maschinot (28 June 1903 –  10 March 1963) was a French footballer. He played for FC Sochaux, and played for the France national football team in the 1930 FIFA World Cup. He scored two goals in one of the two first ever World Cup matches, against Mexico.

International goals
France's goal tally first

External links
 

1903 births
1930 FIFA World Cup players
1963 deaths
French footballers
France international footballers
FC Sochaux-Montbéliard players
Ligue 1 players
Association football forwards